Marileidy Paulino (born 25 October 1996) is a Dominican athlete sprinter specializing in the 400 meters. A double 2020 Tokyo Olympic silver medalist, she placed second in the 400 m and helped the Dominican mixed 4×400 m relay team to finish second as well, running her leg in 48.7 seconds. Paulino won a silver for the 400 m, and ran a 48.47 s leg in the mixed 4 x 400m relay to help the Dominican Republic take gold  at the 2022 World Championships.

Paulino captured bronze medals as part of the national relay teams at the 2018 Central American and Caribbean Games (4×100 m relay) and 2021 World Relays (4×400 m mixed). She took the silver medal in the 200 meters at the 2019 Military World Games. She competed in the 200 meters at the 2019 World Championships, reaching the semi-finals. She won the 2022 Diamond League 400 m  title. Paulino holds Dominican Republic records in the indoor 60 m, 200 m out and indoor, 400 m, as well as the women's and mixed 4×400 m relay.

Personal life
She lives in a single parent family raised by her mother, Anatalia Paulino and is the fifth of six brothers and sisters. The hardships experienced inspired her to set up a foundation to help orphans and this is still a dream she carries in her mind and soul. Paulino was discovered while studying at the Alirio Paulino High School in her hometown of Nizao and began getting involved in sports. She played volleyball and almost made the handball national team. After playing for a year she was seen competing by the then sports minister and she was included in the track and field camp and recruited by the Athletics Federation. She started practicing track and field barefoot. She is defined by her Cuban coach as a disciplined person. As a Christian, she has declared that her natural talent was given by God, who she proclaimed, has held her. As of 2021, she studies physical education at the Universidad Autónoma de Santo Domingo.

She is a corporal from the Dominican Air Force having won several medals in the Dominican Republic Military Games for them.

Career

2015
She competed in the III Dominican Republic Youth Games winning the 100 m silver medal with a 12.70 time representing her province, Peravia. She led her province in the Restoration Cup handball tournament with 6 goals.

2016
She helped the Southern Region of the Dominican Republic to win the Relay, Jump and Throw Festival when she was part of the 4 x 100 meters that won the tournament's bronze medal.

Paulino was part of the 4 x 100 meters relay team that finished in fifth place at the Ibero-American Championships with 44.56. She then traveled to Havana, Cuba for the Memorial Barrientos, arriving in fifth place in the 100 m with 11.61 and winning the silver medal in 200 m with 24.10.

Paulino surprisingly won the Athletics National Championships in 100 m with 11.96 and was defined as recipient of the country's main hope in female athletics. In Cali, Colombia, Paulino participated in the Valle Oro Puro Grand Prix, having finished in the sixth place of the 200 m with 24.15.

Already recruited by the Athletics Federation and envisioned as one of the sport rising talents, she traveled to the NACAC Under-23 Championships in San Salvador, El Salvador. She ranked fifth in 100 m with a time of 12.02 in the heats and was fifth in the final with an 11.98 time. She ran 24.43 in the 200 m preliminary round heats and 24.00 in the final, ending in sixth place.

2017
Praised by the president of the national federation for her physical conditions and mentioned among a group a talented young athletes who were projected to be the future of athletics in the country, she participated in the Dominican Republic Military games, winning the 100 m silver medal with an 11.63 time, bronze in 400 m with a 56.30 and winning the gold medals in 4 x 100m (40.39) and 4 x 100m Relays (3:40.96). Paulino settled with the silver medal when the three times Olympic athlete, Mariely Sánchez defeat her in the National Championships' 100 m finals. At the Ximena Restrepo International Grand Prix held in Medellín, Colombia, she took part in the 100 m finishing in sixth place with 11.67 and had 23.78 in 200 m to win the bronze medal. During the Memorial Barrientos in Cuba she participated in the 200 m where she clocked 24.02 in the preliminary heats and 23.77 in the final winning the gold medal. She also won the gold medal in 4 × 100 metres relay with 45.37. Later that year, she represented the Dominican Republic at the Summer Universiade in the 200 metres where she timed 24.13 finishing 13rd in the heats and 23.95 ranking 11 in the semifinals but did not make it to the finals. She also took part in the 4 × 100 metres relay, but her team was disqualified in the preliminary round.

2018
She took part at the Dominican Republic Military Games winning gold in both 100 m with 11.74 and 200 m with 23.35, and with those results, she qualified for the 2018 Central American and Caribbean Games and later led her military branch team that won the 4 × 100 meters relay.

She participated in the Ximena Restrepo International Grand Prix, she won the gold in 100 m with an 11.62 mark and the bronze in 200 m with 23.63. Preparing tour the 2018 Central American and Caribbean Games, she took part at the Villanova Invitational at the Ocean Breeze Athletic Complex, New York where she set a new 200 m national record when she won the golden medal with 23.82, beating the former record of 24.19 held by Mariely Sánchez Hichez also winning silver medal in the 60 m event by clocking 7.45. During the National Evangelical University internal tournament, she placed first in the preliminary round of the 100 m with 11.98 and the same time to claim the gold medal.

Paulino traveled to Barranquilla, Colombia to the Central American and Caribbean Games where she participated in the 100 meter competition, registering 11.27 during the heats, 11.39 during the semifinals and finally 11.33, ending up in fourth place. In the 200 meters she ran a national record of 22.87 during the preliminary heats, 22.98 in the semifinals and finished in fourth place with a mark of 23.04. In her last participation during the games, she was part of the bronze medal team with Mariely Sánchez, Nicole de Aza and Anabel Medina in the 4 × 100 meters relay that registered 43.68.

Paulino received an apartment from the government along with volleyball player and Central American and Caribbean Games medalist Cándida Arias in her home town of Nizao. She was thankful and declared this was a life changing event for her.

She participated in the 2018 National Games in the 100 m as one of the main attractions, and as expected, she won the gold medal with an 11.92 mark representing the Southern Region. Those games were taken by her as preparations for the following year Pan American Games.

2019
She was instrumental for her consecutive military branch victory at the Dominican Republic Military Games with fourth gold medals: 100 m 11.84, 200 m 23.41, 4 × 100 meters with 44.44 and 4 × 400 meters relay with 3:34.67 and was awarded Best Female Athlete for the games and Armed Forces Athlete of the Year.

At the Grenada Invitational at St. George's, Grenada, she was seventh in 100 m with 11.69 and won the 200 m bronze medal with 23.29. She went to participate at the PURE Athletics/NTC Spring Invitational in Clermont, Florida she registered 11.47 in the heats and was fourth in 100 m with 11.45 also having competed in the 200 m with 23.10. She then headed to the Caterine Ibargüen Grand Prix held in Barranquilla, Colombia she won the golden medal in 100 m with an 11.44, as part of the Dominican Republic team tour before the Pan American Games.

Paulino took her third consecutive gold in 100 m at the Dominican Republic National Championships when she took the win with an 11.55 mark and timed 23.41 to win the 200 m gold medal in a tournament that served as a qualifier for the Pan American Games and the World Championship. At the Colombian city of Cali, she took part at the Grand Prix Valle de Oro Puro, winning the 100 m gold medal with a time of 11.48 and with 23.19, she also won the 200 m.

She declared to be focus on winning medals at the 2019 Pan American Games, even when she confessed that she has not a good start in the 100 m and her best chances were in the 200 m. During the preliminary rounds of the 100 metres she set a time of 11.84 and ranked in 14th place not qualifying for the semifinals. And during the 200 metres she ran 23.40 during the semifinals, qualifying for the finals but ended up in seventh place when she recorded a 23.29 in the final.

She traveled to the World Championships instead of pursuing a medal, hoping to make the qualifying marks for the 2020 Olympics. She represented her country taking part of the 200 metres competition and had a faster looser qualifier with a 23.04 mark in the first round, and a season best of 23.03 in the semifinals, not qualifying for the finals.

Paulino was part of Dominican representative at the Military World Games with the best performance ever, when they collected two silver and two bronze medals. She participated in the 200 m, qualifying with a 23.58 in the heats, 23.46 in the semifinals and registering 23.18 in the final, winning the silver medal.

2020
Paulino was awarded for her National Federation Athlete of the year. After her 2019 golden success in the Dominican Republic Military Games, she was in charge of taking the sports oath in the inauguration of the 2020 edition. During 2020 her coach and her focused in the 400 m.

2021
She competed in her home country at the Isaac Ogando Festival, running a 400 m 50.31 and tournament's gold medal. This mark gave her an Olympic spot for Tokyo 2020, surpassing the required 51.22 mark. She declared that she kept training despite the COVID-19 pandemic and that she already saw herself competing in the games.

During the Colombian National Senior Championships she won the 400 m gold medal when she ran 50.36 and another gold with the 4 x 400 m relay with Anabel Medina, Milagros Durán and Fiodaliza Cofil, with 3:30.02, claiming that those results showed that she would arrive in shape to the Tokyo 2020 Olympics. She also ran 23.10 in the 200 m.

The Dominican Republic participated at the World Athletics Relays and Paulino was part of the Mixed 4 × 400 metres relay and they qualified to the final round with a 3:16.67 mark and qualified for the 2020 Olympic Game and the 2022 World Championships and later won with her team the bronze medal with 3:17.58.

During the Meeting International Città di Savona, in Italy, she beat the meeting record winning the gold medal with a 50.71 and later lower her national record during the Meeting Jaen Paraiso Interior, Andujar, Spain with a tournament and national record of 50.25. She continued he warm up season at the Meeting International de Montreuil, World Athletics bronze level series in Montreuil, France, setting a new meeting record with 50.66 in 400 m just before competing in the Meeting Iberoamericano de Atletismo Huelva, Spain, a European Athletics Outdoor Permit Meetings where she set a tournament record and another national record in the 400 m with 49.99. Back in the Dominican Republic, she set a new 200 m national record at the Félix Sánchez Invitational when she raced a 22:86 time.

As one of the 64 athletes representing her home country at the 2020 Summer Olympics, she was focused in the competition, helped by her Cuban coach Yassen Pérez Gómez, and mostly isolated from the outside world and social media, because wanted to be in the final and win an Olympic medal. In her first Olympic competition, she teamed up with Lidio Andrés Feliz, Anabel Medina, Luguelín Santos and Alexander Ogando for the  mixed 4 × 400 metres relay where they set a national record of 3:12.74 during the heats, with Paulino being the faster woman during that preliminary with 49.60, before setting a new national record in the finals to win the event's silver medal with 3:10.21, running her leg in 48.7 seconds. Paulino and Anabel Medina became the first female athletes for her home country to ever win an Olympic medal. She then headed for the 400 metres where she timed 50.06 during the heats, the quickest time in a global tournament for a preliminary round ever. During the semifinal round, she set a new national record with 49.38 to qualify for the finals. She ran a national record 49.20 to win the silver medal, but she described her winning as miracle because she has only been running 400 m for one year. She became the first Dominican athlete to ever win more than one medal in a single edition of the Olympic Games. She ran with the phrase "God is my hope. Amen" written in her running shoes, and after winning she displayed the Dominican Flag, her Bible and the signed running shoes and confessed she did all these because she wanted the world to know the God's word. She made herself recipient of bonuses from the government, a local supermarket chain, and a house from the CEO of a radio station.

Paulino participated in the 2021 Diamond League, winning at 2021 Athletissima in Lausanne, Switzerland with a 50.40 mark and also winning Meeting de Paris with 50.12, qualifying for the Diamond League Finals, the Weltklasse Zürich where she was the favorite. She ran 49.96 to settle with the silver medal and a US$12,000 cash price, after finishing behind American Quanera Hayes. On 14 September 2021, Paulino surpassed Shaunae Miller-Uibo as world number one in the World Athletics 400m world rankings.

During the annual observance of the National Hispanic Heritage Month, she was nominated by fellow singer and songwriter Natti Natasha for television programs Good Morning America and ABC News "GMA" Inspiration List as an influential Latina.

2022
She won the 200 m silver medal in the 16th Annual Spring Break Classic held in Carolina, Puerto Rico, setting a new national record when she registered 22.70. Paulino broke her 200 m record again during the 11° Meeting International Citta' Di Savona winning the gold with a 22.59 mark. As one of the 2022 Ibero-American Championships favorites, Paulino set a 400 m Ibero-American Championship record and world leading time of 49.49 for the gold medal, breaking the 50.65 from the Ana Guevara's 1998 mark, also winning the gold in the 4x100 m with Martha Méndez, Anabel Medina and Fiordaliza Cofil, with a winning time of 43.81. She won the National Championship in 200 m running in Bayaguana a new national record with 22.36, soon after that, she became brand ambassador for Banco Popular Dominicano.

Paulino won the World Championships 4×400 m relay gold medal, setting with her national team the second-fastest time ever, 3:09.82, she ran her leg in 48.47. Paulino and Cofil became the first women medallist in a World Championship. About overtaking and winning to American Allyson Felix in ther last race, Paulino said that [Felix] will always be the best in the world, and that she has paved the way for them. Paulino claimed the silver meda at the individual 400 m competition with a 49.60 time.

After winning the 2022 Diamond League 4x100 m events held in Doha, Rabat and Laussane, she qualified for the finals, winning with a national record and world leading time of 48.99 to take the Diamond Trophy. She became just the 12th woman in history to break the 49-second barrier.

Achievements
All information taken from World Athletics profile.

International competitions

Circuit wins and titles
 Diamond League champion 400 m:  2022
 400 metres wins, other events specified in parenthesis
 2021 (2): Lausanne Athletissima, Paris Meeting
 2022 (4): Doha Diamond League, Rabat Meeting International Mohammed VI d'Athlétisme, Lausanne, Zürich Weltklasse

References

External links
 

1996 births
Living people
People from Nizao
Dominican Republic female sprinters
Dominican Republic Christians
World Athletics Championships athletes for the Dominican Republic
Central American and Caribbean Games medalists in athletics
Athletes (track and field) at the 2020 Summer Olympics
Olympic athletes of the Dominican Republic
Competitors at the 2018 Central American and Caribbean Games
Central American and Caribbean Games bronze medalists for the Dominican Republic
Medalists at the 2020 Summer Olympics
Olympic silver medalists in athletics (track and field)
Olympic silver medalists for the Dominican Republic
Olympic female sprinters
World Athletics Championships winners